The 2013 Venezuelan political crisis refers to the events occurred after the presidential elections of the same year, mostly protests in response of the electoral result in which Nicolás Maduro the Great Patriotic Pole (GPP) is elected as President of Venezuela.

Presidential elections 
After the presidential elections on 14 April 2013, opposition leader Capriles rejected the bulletin issued by the National Electoral Electoral (CNE) and ask for a recount of the 100% of the votes, because his campaign command reported at least 3,500 irregularities during the electoral process, petition that was joined by CNE rector Vicente Díaz and supported by the governments of Spain, France, the United States, Paraguay, and the Secretary General of the Organization of American States, José Miguel Insulza. At the start, Maduro accepted the audit proposed by the opposition.

Henrique Capriles presented his request formally on 17 April 2013, with all the corresponding complainte and the petition of the total verification of the acts; the CNE held a meeting for hours the same day until it accepted the verification "in second phase", the 46% of the ballot boxes not randomly audited at first. However, this audit was not supported by Capriles, who argued that itt«should have been carried out along with a review of the voting notebooks», reason why the process was challenged before the Supreme Tribunal of Justice (TSJ).

See also 
 2014 Venezuelan protests
 2018 Venezuela election protests
 2016 Venezuela protests

References 

2013 protests
2013 in politics
2013 in Venezuela
Protests in Venezuela
Protests against results of elections
Crisis in Venezuela